Fudbalski klub Sutjeska (Serbian Cyrillic: Фудбалски клуб Сутјеска) is football club from Nikšić, Montenegro, currently competing in the Montenegrin First League. The club was established in 1920, and has been known by its current name since 1945. Since the restoration of Montenegrin independence in 2006, the club has a joint record five First League titles.

FK Sutjeska is a part of the Sutjeska sports society.

History

During the Kingdom of Yugoslavia (1927–1941)
FK Sutjeska is founded at 1927, under the name Sports' club Hajduk (SK Hajduk). Later though (before World War II began), the club changed its name to SK Hercegovac.
Under the name SK Hajduk, the team debuted in official competitions at 1929 – as a participant of Montenegrin Football Championship. Biggest success at that time, team from Nikšić had in the autumn 1929, playing in the Montenegrin Championship finals against SK Crnogorac Cetinje (1–2). During the season 1932, SK Hercegovac played their first official game against FK Budućnost (1–2) and that was the first edition of Montenegrin Derby – the greatest rivalry in the history of Montenegrin football.
Until 1940, the team from Nikšić played only once in the Championship finals, and since the beginning of World War II – the team is disallowed.

After World War II (1945–1984)
After the war, the club was refounded (1945) under the name Sutjeska in honour of Yugoslav communists killed in the Battle of Sutjeska. First game they played on 3 May 1945, against FK Budućnost in Podgorica (2–4). Soon after that, team from Nikšić played in the first football competition after the World War II – 1946 Montenegrin Republic League, winning the third position at the end of season.
First significant success after the war, FK Sutjeska made on season 1948/49, with gaining promotion to Yugoslav Third League. In period 1955–1964, Sutjeska played nine consecutive seasons in Yugoslav Second League. As a member of the Second League, Sutjeska participated in semifinals of 1962–63 Yugoslav Cup.
Historical result of that time, the team made on season 1963–64 – finishing as a champion of Second League, Sutjeska was promoted to the top-tier competition of SFR Yugoslavia. They debuted in Yugoslav First League on 9 August 1964, against Dinamo in Zagreb. During the sixties and seventies, Sutjeska played four seasons in the First League. On season 1971–72, game between Sutjeska and Crvena Zvezda in Nikšić was attended by 19,000 spectators which remained the historical-high attendance on Sutjeska home games.
On season 1973, FK Sutjeska debuted in official international competitions. They represented Yugoslavia in the Balkans Cup, finishing as a second-placed team in the Group A with teams Târgu Mureș and Elbasani.

Transition years (1984–2006)
FK Sutjeska made their come-back to Yugoslav First League on season 1984–85. This time, they spent four consecutive seasons in top-tier competition. Best result in the First league, the team from Nikšić made on season 1984–85, finishing as a ninth-placed team. During that seasons, FK Sutjeska and FK Budućnost played first editions of Montenegrin Derby in the Yugoslav First League.
Together with Budućnost, FK Sutjeska is one of two football clubs from Montenegro who competed in the first tier football league of SFR Yugoslavia. As a result, FK Sutjeska gained considerable prestige and international reputation, and therefore remains one of the biggest sporting institutions in Montenegro. It is especially the most recognized sports organization in the city of Nikšić.
Even after the breakup of Yugoslavia, Sutjeska remained at the top football league in subsequent-state FR Yugoslavia. After a great season in 2003, Sutjeska had a notable appearance in European competition in which they eliminated Racing FC Union Luxembourg in the UEFA Intertoto Cup, but lost in the next round against Tampere United.

Recent history (2006–)
Following Montenegrin independence, Sutjeska became a member of Montenegrin First League. First significant success at that time, the team made in Montenegrin Cup 2006–07. They played in the finals, but lost against FK Rudar (1–2). As a third-placed team on season 2008–09, Sutjeska debuted in the UEFA Europa League, but they were eliminated by FC Partizan Minsk from Belarus (1–1; 1–2).
First national title in the clubs' history, FK Sutjeska won on season 2012–13, with five points more than their eternal rivals – FK Budućnost. During that season, FK Sutjeska home games were watched by more than 7,000 spectators, which was the record-high since the eighties. As a Montenegrin champion, Sutjeska participated in UEFA Champions League 2013-14 qualifiers, with elimination in the second round, against Moldavian side FC Sheriff. 
On season 2013–14, FK Sutjeska became first Montenegrin club which defended a national title from last season. They won the title after the long and dramatic race with FK Lovćen and gained a new opportunity to participate in UEFA Champions League. On second qualifying round, FK Sutjeska again failed against well-known rival – FC Sheriff.
Another season in Europe, Sutjeska played in 2015–16 UEFA Europa League, with two dramatic games against Hungarian-side Debreceni VSC (2–0; 0–3).
On season 2016–17, FK Sutjeska made a new success, this time in Montenegrin Cup. For the second time in history, they played in Cup finals, but this time won the title, winning a game against OFK Grbalj (1–0).
From 2017, FK Sutjeska played two impressive seasons, with two new titles and successful result in European competitions. On season 2017–18, led by Nikšić-born manager Nikola Rakojević, they won the title with 22 points more than their biggest rivals and runners-up from FK Budućnost. Except that, Sutjeska player Igor Ivanović became a top scorer of the season. Next year, FK Sutjeska, again with the head coach Rakojević, defended the title, this time after more intensive struggle with FK Budućnost. A month later, team from Nikšić made good result in 2019–20 Champions League, as they eliminated Slovan Bratislava in the first leg of qualifiers. They are eliminated on the next stage, against APOEL.
After three consecutive seasons finished with domestic trophies, FK Sutjeska performances on season 2019–20 were lower, so they finished as a runners-up. During the season, they made biggest away win in the history of Montenegrin Derby, against FK Budućnost in Podgorica (4–1). Except that, they were among the semifinalists of Montenegrin Cup, but the competition was interrupted due to COVID-19.

Name changes
During the history, FK Sutjeska participated under three different names. Most of the period, they played under today's name.

List of competitive matches (1946–present)
Below is an overall score of all matches of FK Sutjeska in official competitions since 1946. More details at page List of FK Sutjeska seasons.

Sutjeska in European competitions

FK Sutjeska debuted in European competitions at 2003, when they played in UEFA Intertoto Cup. After the Montenegrin independence, Sutjeska often played in UEFA competitions, with two seasons in the Champions League qualifiers. Except participation in UEFA competitions, during the history Budućnost played once in the Balkans Cup.

UEFA competitions

{| class="wikitable" style="text-align:center"
|-
!Competition
!Seasons
!First
!Last
!
!
!
!
!
!
!
|-
|style="text-align:left;"|UEFA Champions League||4||2013–14||2019–20||10||0||3||7||3||20||–17
|-
|style="text-align:left;"|UEFA Europa League||6||2009–10||2020–21||11||1||3||7||8||16||–8
|-
|style="text-align:left;"|UEFA Europa Conference League||1||2021–22||2021–22||4||1||2||1||2||4||–2
|-
|style="text-align:left;"|Intertoto Cup||1||2003||2003||4||1||2||1||4||2||+2
|-
!OVERALL||colspan="3"|12 seasons||29||3||10||16||17||42||–25
|}

Balkans Cup

FK Sutjeska played one season in the Balkans Cup, a regional competition for clubs from Yugoslavia, Albania, Bulgaria, Greece, Romania and Turkey. In season 1973, they played against Romanian team Târgu Mureș and Elbasani from Albania, finishing as a second-placed team in the Group A.

 Honours and achievements 
 National Championships – 5Montenegrin First League: Winners (5): 2012–13, 2013–14, 2017–18, 2018–19, 2021–22 Runners-up (3): 2014–15, 2019–20, 2020–21
 National Cups – 1Montenegrin Cup: Winners (1): 2016–17 Runners-up (1): 2006–07
 Championships (1922–1940)Montenegrin Championship (1922–1940) Runners-up (1): 1929

 Supporters and rivalries 

"The Dukes" (Vojvode) is the popular name for the most ardent Sutjeska fans. They have been established in 1988 in Nikšić and today constitute one of the most numerous groups of supporters in Montenegro. Their place is in the eastern stand, and they traditionally follow all the matches of all sports that compete under the "Sutjeska" name, both home and away matches. The biggest Sutjeska rival is FK Budućnost Podgorica, as the "Barbarians" (Varvari) are the other large group of supporters in the country. They also have a rivalry with Fap mašina of Čelik Nikšić, with whom they contest the Nikšić derby.

 Youth program 

Sutjeska's youth academy is one of the most famous and recognized in Montenegro along with that of FK Budućnost. The first Sutjeska player to have been selected for the Yugoslav national team was Vojin Lazarević, who would later have a bright career with Red Star Belgrade. Lazarević was capped by the Yugoslav senior side in a friendly match against Romania in 1964 while still playing in Nikšić.

In 1976, a notably talented generation of the youth team became the champions of Yugoslavia; the team included names that would later turn to be successful soccer players like Brajan Nenezić, Mojaš Radonjić, and Pero Giljen. Pero's own son Vladan Giljen became a successful goalkeeper after learning his trade in Sutjeska. Four years after the famed 1976 generation made its first mark in Yugoslav football, Sutjeska won the Yugoslav Cup in 1980 – becoming the only Yugoslav club at the time to have won both trophies.

In 2010, Sutjeska's cadet team (for under-17 players) were champions of Montenegro in the country's U-17 league. During the same year, Sutjeska's U-19 team won the Gallipoli Cup in Italy, one of the most prestigious international tournaments for players of this age group. The U-19 teams of U.S. Lecce, A.S. Bari, FC Zenit Saint Petersburg, and FC Krylia Sovetov Samara all competed for the title which Sutjeska's youth team won.

Most notably, Sutjeska was the club in which the famous Juventus F.C. former striker Mirko Vučinić began his career.

 Stadium 

City stadium "Kraj Bistrice" is built during the 1946. During the history, Stadium Kraj Bistrice, as a home of FK Sutjeska, was renovated a few times. During the 60's, there was stands from all four sides, and capacity of stadium was 15,000. After the 2000, there was a new renovation of stadium. In 2001, old south and north stands were torn down, and a new east stand was built, so capacity of stadium was reduced to 10,800. After the Montenegrin independence, following the UEFA rules, stadium capacity is reduced to 5,214 seats. At 2015, floodlights were installed, and first match in the night-term occurred on 7 August 2016 (FK Sutjeska – FK Lovćen). Located around the building is a spacious parking lot. The sports complex adjacent to the stadium is a modern training field with synthetic surface and a mini auditorium space.

Players

Current squad

Player RecordsMost performances:  Brajan Nenezić – 293/37 (1975–1989)Top goalscorer:  Željko Bajčeta – 43 (1980–1990)

 Notable players 
For the list of former and current players with Wikipedia article, please see :Category:FK Sutjeska Nikšić players.

During the history, several notable players started their career or played for FK Sutjeska. Most known are Nikšić-born players Mirko Vučinić, Andrija Delibašić, Miodrag Bajović, Miladin Bečanović, Vojin Lazarević and Brajan Nenezić. Player with the most appearances is Brajan Nenezić, who played 293 matches in period 1975–1989. Below is the list of international players and domestic players which, during their career, played for FK Sutjeska and represented their countries at national teams or made international careers.

 Mirko Vučinić
 Brajan Nenezić
 Vojin Lazarević
 Andrija Delibašić
 Duško Radinović
 Vukašin Poleksić
 Miodrag Bajović
 Miladin Bečanović
 Ranko Zirojević
 Božidar Bandović
 Vojo Gardašević
 Nikola Rakojević
 Željko Bajčeta
 Drago Kovačević

 Milorad Bajović
 Zoran Banović
 Momir Bakrač
 Željko Vuković
 Slobodan Rojević
 Miodrag Krivokapić
 Zoran Lemajić
 Dragan Radojičić
 Srđan Radonjić
 Zoran Batrović
 Vanja Grubač
 Zdravko Drinčić
 Vladan Kostić
 Duško Radinović

 Zoran Vorotović
 Dražen Međedović
 Ivan Bošković
 Damir Čakar
 Marko Ćetković
 Ivan Janjušević
 Vlado Jeknić
 Admir Adrović
 Vladan Giljen
 Slavenko Kuzeljević
 Miloš Bursać
 Miloš Drizić
 Zoran Nikitović
 Zoran Jovičić

  Saša Branežac
 Kuzman Babeu
 Đorđe Šušnjar
 Sahmir Garčević
 Bojan Magazin
 Milenko Milošević
  Predrag Pažin
 Darko Krsteski
 Boban Nikolovski
 Masato Fukui
 Anzour Nafash

Coaching staff

Historical list of coaches

 Ljubiša Spajić 
 Stevan Čulik 
 Milan Panić 
 Blažo Đurović 
 Sreto Stanojević 
 Savo Stanišić 
 Dragoslav Filipović 
 Anton Habić 
 Mihailo Koprivica 
 Slava Stefanović 
 Aleksandar Petrović
 Vojin Božović 
 Živko Popadić 
 Bimo Harović 
 Josip Takač 
 Milence Petrović 
 Ilija Rajković 
 Boris Marović 
 Vasilije Šijaković
 Ilija Kaljević 
 Dragoljub Milošević 
 Sreten Petković 
 Dragutin Spasojević
 Božidar Drenovac 
 Vasilije Darmanović
 Munib Saračević 
 Milan Zirojević 
 Ratomir Čabrić 
 Srboljub Markušević 
 Bruno Repar 
 Novak Bulatović 
 Vlatko Vujošević 
 Nedeljko Gugolj 
 Mojaš Radonjić 
 Drago Kovačević 
 Mirko Minić 
 Rajko Nikolić 
 Stanislav Karasi 
 Vladimir Pejović 
 Milan Živadinović (1981–1983)
 Vukašin Višnjevac (1983)
 Milovan Đorić (1990–1991)
 Drago Kovačević (1991–1992)
 Nikola Rakojević (1992–1993)
 Dragoljub Bekvalac (1998–1999)
 Žarko Olarević (1999–2000)
 Pero Giljen (2000)
 Nenad Starovlah (2000–2001)
 Vojin Lazarević (2001)
 Brajan Nenezić (2001–2002)
 Pero Giljen (2002)
 Branko Smiljanić (2002–2003)
 Jovan Gardašević (2003)
 Slavenko Kuzeljević (2003)
 Miodrag Bajović (2004)
 Pero Giljen (2005)
 Branko Smiljanić (2005)
 Brajan Nenezić (2006)
 Pero Giljen (2006–2008)
 Brajan Nenezić (2008)
 Nikola Rakojević (2008–2010)
 Pero Giljen (2010)
 Nikola Rakojević (January 2011–April 2011)
 Dragan Mijanović (April 2011–June 2011)
 Dragan Lacmanović (July 2011–October 2011)
 Slaviša Mirković (October 2011–March 2012)
 Saša Petrović (March 2012–May 2012)
 Dragan Radojičić (June 2012–May 2014)
 Mile Tomić (June 2014–March 2015)
 Brajan Nenezić (March 2015–July 2015)
 Aleksandar Nedović (July 2015–May 2016)
 Nebojša Jovović (June 2016–February 2017)
 Nikola Rakojević (February 2017–July 2020)
 Dragan Radojičić (July 2020–November 2020)
 Miljan Radović (November 2020–May 2021) 
 Milija Savović (June 2021–August 2022) 
 Nenad Brnović (August 2022–) 

SponsorsOfficial kit supplier''' – (2018–2019) NAAI, (2019– ) Joma

See also
List of FK Sutjeska seasons
Montenegrin Derby
Montenegrin First League
Montenegrin clubs in Yugoslav football competitions (1946–2006)
Nikšić

References

External links 
 

 
Association football clubs established in 1927
Football clubs in Montenegro
Football clubs in Yugoslavia
1927 establishments in Montenegro
Sport in Nikšić